The Los Peñasquitos Creek Arch Bridge is a pair of road bridges located in San Diego, California, USA.

It now serves as a service road and bike path.

The new Los Peñasquitos Creek bridge was first built in 1966 as the southbound lanes of the U.S. Route 395 freeway. It was completely replaced by a prestressed concrete girder bridge during the widening of the Interstate 15 freeway in 1976.

Cara Knott Memorial Bridge
In 1995, the new bridge was renamed the Cara Knott Memorial Bridge after 20-year-old Cara Knott, a San Diego State University student who was stopped and then subsequently murdered by California Highway Patrol officer Craig Peyer near the bridge on the night of December 27, 1986. Peyer was later convicted in the case and is serving a 25 years-to-life sentence in prison. In 2000, Cara's father, Sam, died of a heart attack, just a few yards from the exact place where his daughter was killed, while taking care of a garden the family built to honor Cara.

References

Bridges in San Diego
Concrete bridges in California
Open-spandrel deck arch bridges in the United States
Road bridges in California
Interstate 15
Bridges completed in 1949
Bridges completed in 1966
Bridges completed in 1976
1976 establishments in California